Bledius annularis, or ringed borrow rove beetle, is a species of spiny-legged rove beetle in the family Staphylinidae. It is found in North America.

The lectotype for this taxon from a male specimen, collected from Lake Superior, and is housed within the Museum of Comparative Zoology at Harvard University.

Habitat and distribution
Within New Brunswick, B. annularis is characteristically known to frequent damp clay riverbanks and shaded streams.

A number of closely related species of Bledius are commonly grouped together and referred to as the "annularis complex", then further subdivided into the "annularis group". This 'complex' of difficult to distinguish species is distributed right across northern North America, and consists of B. annularis, B. breretoni, B. honestus, B. languidus, B.mysticus, B. nebulosus, B. sinuatus, B. stabilis, and B. washingtonensis.

Description 
The beetle is slender and elongate in appearance, measuring between 3.8 mm and 4.5 mm. Its head and thorax, as well as the tip of its abdomen are all black in colour, whilst the base of its abdomen, its elytra and its antennae are reddish-brown. Its legs are dark yellow. Its head is lightly granulate and also finely punctate. The thorax is not as wide as it is long, whilst the base of the abdomen is narrower than the elytra. The abdomen of this beetle sometimes appears slightly banded as a result of the hind margins of the upper (dorsal) segments being slightly darker in colour.

References

External links
 Photograph of B. annularis (on Barcode of Life Data Systems)
Photograph of B. annularis (side view) (on University of British Columbia website)
Entry for Bledius annularis cytochrome oxidase (mitochondrial DNA sequence on National Center for Biotechnology Information database.)

Oxytelinae
Beetles described in 1863
Articles created by Qbugbot